The men's 60 kg competition of the judo events at the 2011 Pan American Games in Guadalajara, Mexico, was held on October 29 at the CODE II Gymanasium.  The defending champion was Miguel Albarracín of Argentina.

Schedule
All times are Central Standard Time (UTC-6).

Results
Legend

1st number = Ippon
2nd number = Waza-ari
3rd number = Yuko

Bracket

Repechage round
Two bronze medals were awarded.

References

M60
Judo at the Pan American Games Men's Extra Lightweight